The River class were classes of locomotives on a number of railways:

 Highland Railway River Class - 4-6-0
 Nigerian Railways River class - 2-8-2
 SECR K and SR K1 classes - 2-6-4 tank